is a 2019 Japanese superhero kaiju film, serving as the sequel and film adaptation of the 2018 Ultra Series television series Ultraman R/B. It was released in Japan on March 8, 2019.

The movie's main catchphrase is

Story

A year after the Reugosite incident, Katsumi is conflicted of what he wants to with his life while Isami and Asahi are off following their own dreams. Then, a mysterious wish-granting Ultraman named Tregear appears in Ayaka City and causes Katsumi to consider seeking for "his own dream". When monsters suddenly reappear in Ayaka City as the result of Tregear's wish granting, Katsumi and Isami are joined by their sister Asahi and Riku Asakura in fighting them and Tregear as the Minato family's strong bonds would result with the creation of Ultraman Gruebe.

Production
The movie was announced at Tokyo Comic-Con in November 30, 2018. During the press conference, Yuya Hirata and Ryosuke Koike were joined by Takeshi Tsuruno, the actor of Shin Asuka in Ultraman Dyna, who would sing the ending theme of the movie with DAIGO, the actor of Nozomu Taiga in Ultraman Saga.

Cast
: 
: 
: 
: 
: 
: 
: 
: 
: 
: 
Chief Cabinet Secretary: 
: 
: 
: 
: 
:

Theme song

Lyrics: Takeshi Tsuruno
Composition: DAIGO
Arrangement: Sho from My First Story
Artist:  × DAIGO

References

External links 
 at Tsuburaya Productions 

2019 films
2010s Japanese-language films
Ultra Series films
Shochiku films
Films about siblings
Films about families
Crossover tokusatsu films
2010s Japanese films